Andrea Ferrari may refer to:

 Andrea Ferrari (footballer) (born 1986), Italian football goalkeeper
 Andrea Ferrari (sailor) (1915–?), Italian Olympic sailor
 Andrea Carlo Ferrari (1850–1921), cardinal of the Roman Catholic Church and Archbishop of Milan from 1894 to his death
 Andrea C. Ferrari, Italian professor of nanotechnology